Loser Takes All is a 1956 British comedy film directed by Ken Annakin, starring Glynis Johns, Rossano Brazzi, and Robert Morley, with a screenplay by Graham Greene based on his 1955 novella of the same name.

Synopsis
Tony Bertrand, an assistant accountant in a London firm, discovers a flaw in the accounting system. His boss, Dreuther, the powerful director and major shareholder of his company, arranges for Bertrand and his wife-to-be, Cary, to marry and honeymoon in Monte Carlo. Dreuther will meet the couple in Monte Carlo and be their witness, on board his private yacht.

Dreuther does not show up, and the couple marry anyway; after two days at an expensive hotel, they are broke. With his last remaining cash, Bertand buys a 'system' from a tout that will guarantee winning at the casino. He starts to win large sums, and, fascinated by the mathematics of gambling, spends all his time in the casino. Out of pique, Cary takes up with Tony, a fellow guest.

Dreuther finally arrives. Bertram agrees to sell his 'system' to another director of the company, in return for his shareholding, but the deal doesn't go through. Betrand and Cary get back together, and Bertram is happy - it is "loser takes all".

Cast
 Glynis Johns as Cary
 Rossano Brazzi as Bertrand
 Robert Morley as Dreuther
 Tony Britton as Tony
 Felix Aylmer as the Other
 Joyce Carey as Bird's Nest
 Geoffrey Keen as Reception Clerk
 Peter Illing as Stranger
 Albert Lieven as Hotel Manager
 A.E. Matthews as Elderly Man in Casino
 Shirley Anne Field as Attractive Girl in Casino
 Hal Osmond as Liftman (uncredited)
 Mona Washbourne as Nurse (uncredited)
 André Maranne as Bar Waiter (uncredited)
 Charles Lloyd Pack as Sir Walter Blixon (uncredited)
 Walter Hudd as Arnold (uncredited)
 Joan Benham as Miss. Bullen (uncredited)

References

External links

1956 films
British comedy films
1956 comedy films
Films about gambling
CinemaScope films
Films directed by Ken Annakin
Films based on works by Graham Greene
Films with screenplays by Graham Greene
Films set in Monaco
Films shot in Monaco
Films scored by Alessandro Cicognini
1950s English-language films
1950s British films